Mark Dubowitz (born 11 September 1968) is a South African-born Canadian-American attorney and former venture capitalist, currently serving as CEO of the Foundation for Defense of Democracies, a non-profit think-tank and lobbying institute that advocates for hawkish foreign policy. He is a proponent of sanctions against Iran to escalate a confrontation with Iran and was a leading critic of the Iran nuclear agreement, officially called the Joint Comprehensive Plan of Action. According to The New York Times, “Mark Dubowitz’s campaign to draw attention to what he saw as the flaws in the Iran nuclear deal has taken its place among the most consequential ever undertaken by a Washington think tank leader.” 

He was a leading critic of the Iran nuclear agreement, Joint Comprehensive Plan of Action, but then tried to save it after President Trump withdrew from the agreement according to his own account.

Early life and education
Dubowitz is a citizen of the United States. He was born in South Africa and raised in Toronto.

Dubowitz earned a master's degree in international public policy from the Paul H. Nitze School of Advanced International Studies at Johns Hopkins University, where he focused on China. He also earned a Juris Doctor and Master of Business Administration from the University of Toronto. He has also studied at Jerusalem's Hebrew University. He spent the first 8 years after law school working on funding technology start-ups in Toronto, as an attorney and venture capitalist in Toronto.

Career
Dubowitz is the CEO of the Foundation for Defense of Democracies. He co-founded FDD's Center on Economic and Financial Power and FDD's Center on Military and Political Power, and is the author or co-author of more than twenty studies on economic sanctions. He also is co-chair of the Project on U.S. Middle East Nonproliferation Strategy.

He joined the FDD in 2003 and became an authority on international terrorism and sanctions against states that sponsor terrorism such as Iran and North Korea. "I was a strange kid with an obsession with terrorism and plane hijackings. On September 11th it turned out that terrorism is not just an international problem, after it hit us at home," he told Ynet news. In 2003 I joined a small organization (FDD) despite not having any relevant political or policy experience and coming from a wholly different background."

Dubowitz is a lecturer and senior research fellow at the Munk School of Global Affairs at the University of Toronto, where he teaches and conducts research on international negotiations, sanctions, and Iran's nuclear program.

He is currently sanctioned by the Iranian government.

Opposition to Iran nuclear deal 
According to The New York Times, "no one outside the Trump administration was a more persistent or effective critic [of the Iran nuclear agreement] than Mark Dubowitz". As a vocal critic of the agreement, Dubowitz has stated that it did not address Iran's non-nuclear malign activity, such as its misappropriation of economic relief to fund terrorism, and "its lack of any limits on the regime’s ballistic missile program and its 'sunset provisions' that would allow Iran to increase its capacity to enrich uranium beginning seven years from now." According to Politico, although Dubowitz "was an intense critic of the Iran deal," he "nonetheless advocated against scrapping it."

He told Ynet in 2011 that at FDD they "closely monitor international companies that do business with Iran, invest in Iran's energy sector and provide important equipment and technologies to this sector. They also monitor the movement of commercial vessels coming into and leaving Iran.

Dubowitz opposed the Obama administration's nuclear diplomacy with Iran, testifying before Congress on several occasions against the nuclear talks, including to the Senate Foreign Relations Committee (February 2014), Senate Banking Committee (January 27, 2015), House Financial Services Committee (July 22, 2015), the Senate Foreign Relations Committee (July 29, 2015), Senate Committee on Banking, Housing, and Urban Affairs (August 5, 2015), and the House Ways and Means Committee (November 4, 2015).

Dubowitz authored or co-authored several op-eds on the Iran deal, published in The New York Times, The Wall Street Journal, and USA Today.

References

External links
 FDD Bio Page
 Mark Dubowitz Website
 

1968 births
Living people
American activists
Activists from Toronto
American people of South African descent
South African emigrants to Canada
Canadian expatriates in the United States
University of Toronto alumni
Paul H. Nitze School of Advanced International Studies alumni
American venture capitalists
American chief executives